Jamie Zahlaway Belsito (born November 22, 1973) is an American politician representing the 4th Essex district in the Massachusetts House of Representatives. Belsito was elected on November 30, 2021, in a special election following former Representative Brad Hill's appointment to the Massachusetts Gaming Commission. Belsito is the first democrat to represent the 4th Essex district since 1858, and was sworn in on December 8, 2021.  Belsito is the first Arab American woman to be elected to office in Massachusetts.

Belsito is the founder of a national nonprofit, the Maternal Mental Health Leadership Alliance, based in Washington D.C.

She is the great-niece of USAF Technical Sergeant Richard B. Fitzgibbon, Jr., the first American to die in the Vietnam War.

In the final days of her term as a state representative she accused Israel of genocide. She tweeted that the US should acknowledge the Israeli administration was "an apartheid run thuggery terrorist regime" and that "killing and land taking has nothing to do with anti-semitism. It is genocide."

See also
 2021–2022 Massachusetts legislature

References

Living people
1973 births
People from Topsfield, Massachusetts
Democratic Party members of the Massachusetts House of Representatives
Politicians from Boston
21st-century American politicians